Voir Dire (literally "See Say" in French) is the fifth studio album by the heavy metal band Will Haven. It was released in 2011 on Bieler Bros. Records. It is the first album to feature frontman Grady Avenell since 2001's critically acclaimed Carpe Diem, and also features new bassist Chris Fehn (ex-percussionist of Slipknot). The album was well received by critics, and featured in Metal Hammer's top 50 albums of 2011. The LP edition of the album was issued by Holy Roar Records in 2012.

Track listing

Personnel
Will Haven
Grady Avenell – vocals
Jeff Irwin – guitar
Anthony Paganelli – guitar
Chris Fehn – bass guitar
Adrien Contreras – keyboards
Mitch Wheeler – drums

Production
Matt Pedri – engineering, production
Chance Phillips – artwork, photography
Jason Broussard – artwork, photography

References

2011 albums
Will Haven albums